The word witch derives from the Old English nouns   ('male witch, warlock') and   ('female witch'). The word's further origins in Proto-Germanic and Proto-Indo-European are unclear.

History
Throughout history there has not been a consistent definition of the term witch. Johannes Nider and other 15th century writers used the Latin term  to mean witch—a person who performed , harmful acts of sorcery, against others. The witch hunts of medieval Europe differed from pre-Christian practices in condemning the witch as a moral corruption, rather than focusing on whether the act of sorcery was harmful, expanding the customary understanding of the  concept.

Germanic etymology
The Old English verb  has a cognate in Middle Low German  (attested from the 13th century, besides  'to bewitch').  The further etymology of this word is problematic. It has no clear cognates in Germanic outside of English and Low German, and there are numerous possibilities for the Indo-European root from which it may have been derived.

The OED states that the noun is "apparently" deverbal (derived from ), but for the verb merely states that it is "of obscure origin".
Grimm,  connects the "Ingvaeonic word"  with Gothic  'sacred' (Proto-Indo European (PIE)  'to separate, to divide', probably via early Germanic practices of cleromancy such as those reported by Tacitus).
Grimm also considers  'to curve, bend' (which became  'hop, dance') and  'to move' (in a sense of  'to make mysterious gestures'). 
R. Lühr connects  'prophetic, mantic',  'to practice divination' (Middle Low German  'bewitch',  'soothsayer') and suggests Proto-Germanic , geminated (c.f. The basic form would then be the feminine,   <  <  with palatalization due to the preceding i and the following *æ < *ōn in early Ingvaeonic. The palatal -cc-  in  would then be analogous to the feminine.
An alternative possibility is to derive the palatal  directly from the verb  < . Lühr conversely favours derivation of this verb from the noun.
The American Heritage Dictionary of the English Language connects PIE  'rouse' (English wake), and offers the Proto-Germanic reconstruction  'one who wakes the dead'.

From Old to Modern English
The Middle English word  did not differentiate between feminine and masculine, however the masculine meaning became less common in Standard English, being replaced by words like "wizard" and "warlock". The modern spelling witch with the medial 't' first appears in the 16th century. In current colloquial English witch is almost exclusively applied to women, and the OED has "now only dialectal" for the masculine noun.

Figurative use to refer to a bewitching young girl begins in the 18th century, while wiche as a contemptuous term for an old woman is attested since the 15th century. "A witch of Endor" (alluding to ) as a fanciful term for a medium appears in 19th-century literature.

The meaning "an adherent of Wicca" (male or female) is due to Gerald Gardner's purported "Witch Cult", and now appears as a separate meaning of the word also in mainstream dictionaries. For example, Merriam-Webster currently distinguishes four meanings of the noun witch,
1. "a person (especially a woman) who is credited with having usually malignant supernatural powers"
2. "a practitioner of witchcraft especially in adherence with a neo-pagan tradition or religion (such as Wicca)"
3. "a mean or ugly old woman: hag crone"
4. "a charming or alluring girl or woman"

Other suggestions for the underlying root are untenable or widely rejected:
 Grimm reject a connection with  'speak', suggested by P. Lessiak (ZfDA 53, 1912).
Walter William Skeat derived the word from PIE , Old English  'wise man, wizard' and  'to know', considering it a corruption of an earlier . No Old English spelling with -t- is known, and this etymology is not accepted today.
Robert Graves in his 1948 The White Goddess, in discussing the willow which was sacred to the Greek goddess Hecate, connects the word to a root   which connotes bending or pliance, by saying: "Its connection with witches is so strong in Northern Europe, that the words 'witch' and 'wicked' are derived from the same ancient word for willow, which also yields 'wicker'." This confounds English and Scandinavian evidence, since the weak root in English has no connection with willows, and Old Norse has no word for witch cognate to the English.

Old English
Old English also had  'witch, fury', whence Modern English hag, of uncertain origin, but cognate to German , from an Old High German , Proto-Germanic  (OED), perhaps from a  'to mar, damage', meaning 'field-damager' (the suggestion of Grimm). The element hag-  originally means 'fence, wooden enclosure', and hence also 'enclosed fields, cultivated land'.

The earliest recorded use of the word is in the Laws of Ælfred, which date to about 890:

In the homilies of the Old English grammarian Ælfric, dating to the late 10th century we find:

In both these examples  is the plural noun, not an adjective. The adjective  ('foul') can mean 'physically unclean' as well as 'morally or spiritually unclean' or 'wicked'.

The word  is associated with animistic healing rites in Halitgar's Latin Penitential where it is stated that
Some men are so blind that they bring their offering to earth-fast stone and also to trees and to wellsprings, as the witches teach, and are unwilling to understand how stupidly they do or how that dead stone or that dumb tree might help them or give forth health when they themselves are never able to stir from their place.

The phrase  ('as the witches teach') seems to be an addition to Halitgar's original, added by an 11th-century Old English translator.

Other languages

See also
Etymology of Wicca

Notes

Further reading
 Includes a table of Old English laws on perjury, magic, lybblac, secret murder, prostitution and idol worship listing terms used in each law.

 
Etymology
Etymologies
English words